Taybeh ( Ṭayyibaḧ) also spelled Taibeh or Tayiba may also refer to:

Israel
 Taibe, Galilee, a village in the Jezreel Valley, Israel
 Tayibe, a city in central Israel

Jordan
 At-Tayba, Petra, also written Taybeh, a village in the protected region of Petra, south of Wadi Musa on the road to Aqaba

Lebanon
 Taybeh (Marjaayoun), a village in Lebanon
 Taybeh (Baalbek), a village in Lebanon

Palestine
 At-Tayba, a Palestinian village in the northern West Bank
 Taybeh, a mainly Christian Palestinian town situated in the Ramallah area, central West Bank
 Taybeh Brewery, in Taybeh, central West Bank

Syria
 Al-Taybah, a village in the Syrian Desert
 Al-Taybah, Rif Dimashq Governorate, a village near Damascus, southern Syria
 Al-Taybah, Deir ez-Zor Governorate, a village in Mayadin District, eastern Syria
 Al-Taybah al-Gharbiyah, a village near Homs, central Syria
 Taybat al-Imam, a town near Hama, northern Syria

United Arab Emirates 

 Tayyibah, a village in the emirate of Fujairah

See also

Tayyip (disambiguation)
Lashkar-e-Tayyiba, Islamist militant group in Kashmir